Faeroestygarctus dezioae is a species of armoured marine tardigrades. It is the only species of Faroestygarctus, a genus of the family Stygarctidae.

The genus name refers to the type locality: the Faroe Islands. It was described in 2012 by Jesper Guldberg Hansen, Reinhardt Kristensen and Aslak Jørgensen.

References

Stygarctidae
Animals described in 2012
Taxa named by Jesper Guldberg Hansen
Taxa named by Reinhardt Møbjerg Kristensen
Taxa named by Aslak Jørgensen